Outlying Islands may refer to:

In geography
 Hong Kong
Outlying Islands, Hong Kong, islands outside mainland New Territories, Kowloon and Hong Kong Island in Hong Kong
Islands District, a Hong Kong district

 Other
List of outlying islands of Indonesia
Islands of the Republic of China (Taiwan) other than Taiwan Island
New Zealand outlying islands
List of outlying islands of Scotland
United States Minor Outlying Islands

In theatre
Outlying Islands (play) (2002), a play by David Greig